Richard Chamberlin may refer to:

 Richard Eliot Chamberlin (1923–1994), American mathematician
 G. Richard Chamberlin (born 1946), member of the Georgia House of Representatives

See also
 Richard Chamberlain (disambiguation)